William George "Wheezer" Dell (June 11, 1886 – August 24, 1966) was an American Major League Baseball pitcher in 1912 and 1915–17. Dell pitched for the St. Louis Cardinals and Brooklyn Robins. He was the first Nevada-born player in major league history.

For his long career in the minor leagues, which included 230 victories over 13 seasons, Dell is a member of the Pacific Coast League Hall of Fame.

References

External links

1886 births
1966 deaths
Major League Baseball pitchers
St. Louis Cardinals players
Brooklyn Robins players
Butte Miners players
Seattle Giants players
Vernon Tigers players
Seattle Indians players
Atlanta Crackers players
Beaumont Exporters players
Baseball players from Nevada
People from Elko County, Nevada